Murray Davidson (born 7 March 1988) is a Scottish footballer, who plays for St Johnstone, where he has been since 2009. Davidson started his career at Livingston in 2006, with a loan spell at Cowdenbeath in 2007.

He has played once for Scotland, in 2012 and plays as a midfielder.

Early career
Born in Edinburgh, Davidson grew up in the small Borders town of Innerleithen where he played for the local sports club Leithen Vale, in the same team as Ross Campbell, who would go on to represent Hibernian and Dunfermline Athletic, and Steven Notman, who was to play for Hibernian and Berwick Rangers. The team was the most successful in the sports club's history, winning countless trophies both at home and abroad, and a number of the boys, including Davidson, went on to play at a higher level.

Club career

Livingston
After appearing for Leithen Vale, Davidson started his senior career with Livingston. In the 2006–07 season, he made his debut against his future club, St Johnstone, coming on as a substitute for Graham Dorrans in the 85th minute, in a 2–1 win and would make one more appearance that season. Shortly after making his Livingston debut, in January 2007, Davidson moved on loan to Scottish Third Division club Cowdenbeath. He later spoke about how the move had helped him in his career.

The following season, Davidson made six appearances, and scored his first career goal – again against St Johnstone– in the final game of the season, in a 5–2 loss. However, during the season, Davidson was sent off twice; first was in a game against Dundee for receiving a second yellow card on 11 March 2008 and the second came in his next match, against Greenock Morton for serious foul play in the last minutes. At the end of the 2007–08 season, Davidson signed a two-year deal with the club.

The 2008–09 season proved to be a breakout season for Davidson, as he scored six goals this season, including a brace against Dunfermline Athletic in a 4–2 win on 10 March 2009. However at the end of the season, the club faced further financial problems and were on the verge of being liquidated before a deal was struck to save the club, but they were subsequently demoted to the Scottish Third Division. Shortly after the end of the season, Davidson was the subject of transfer speculation, alongside Dave Mackay, the two being linked with Dundee and Motherwell. Following the club's demotion to the Scottish Third Division, Davidson said he believed the SFL were wrong to punish Livingston, believing Angelo Massone was the one to blame. Davidson also stated that he had a strained relationship with Massone, who at one point arranged for him to go on trial with Parma, but Davidson turned down the chance.

St Johnstone

2009–10 season
At the end of the 2008–09 season, Davidson transferred to St Johnstone and signed a three-year contract with the club. He made his debut in a St Johnstone shirt in a 5–0 win over Stenhousemuir in the Scottish League Cup. Davidson scored his first goal on his league debut, a 2–2 draw against Motherwell. He scored again two weeks later, in a 2–2 draw against Hearts. Davidson quickly became a regular first team player and made a significant impact. On 30 March 2010, Davidson scored against Rangers in a 4–1 win. In his first season, Davidson made 39 appearances in all competitions and scored five times.

On 13 May 2010, Davidson signed a one-year contract extension, keeping him at the club until 2013.

2010–11 season
In the 2010–11 season, Davidson retained his first team status. He scored his first goal of the season, in the second round of the Scottish League Cup, in a 2–1 win over Morton. However, in a match against Rangers, on 28 August 2010, Davidson got injured and was stretchered off in the first half after clashing with team-mate Marcus Haber although he managed to recover from the injury ahead of the next match. Davidson scored in the quarter-final of the Scottish League Cup, in a 3–2 loss against Celtic.

Davidson made forty-three appearances and scored three times in all competitions, failing to fulfill a promise to score more goals than the last season.

2011–12 season
Early in the 2011–12 season, Rangers had a bid for Davidson turned down by St Johnstone. The offer was believed to be in the region of £250,000. Davidson also attracted interest from Wolves, Bolton and Everton.

Davidson scored his first goal of the season, in the second round of the Scottish League Cup, in a 3–0 win over Livingston. In a match against Dundee United on 27 August 2011, Davidson suffered a knee injury and was stretchered off in the first half. After a three-month lay-off, due to injury, Davidson made his return on 15 October 2011, in a 2–0 win over Inverness Caledonian Thistle.

Despite the injury, Davidson continued to attracted interest, mostly from Rangers. Manager Steve Lomas said he would sell Davidson, but only for a valuation of £1m. Rangers' interest in signing Davidson ended when they entered administration in February 2012.

On 25 February 2012, Davidson scored his first league goal in over two years, in a 3–1 win over Dunfermline Athletic. He soon scored his second in a 2–1 win over Hearts on 24 March. Unlike the first-two season, Davidson playing time was reduced to twenty-seven league appearances, due to recurring injuries.

2012–13 season
In the 2012–13 season, Davidson was appointed as a vice-captain at St Johnstone. Having qualified for the Europa League the previous season, in the second qualifying round, St Johnstone played Turkish side Eskişehirspor, but they proved to be too strong, as Saints lost 2–0 away and drew 1–1 at home. Davidson said captaining the team against a European side was a 'massive honour'.

Davidson scored his first league goal of the season on 12 August, in a 1–1 draw against Motherwell. Then in early-October, Davidson scored two goals in two consecutive games, against St Mirren and Kilmarnock respectively. Later in the 2012–13 season, Davidson went on to score league goals against Kilmarnock (and another on 9 March 2013), St Mirren and Ross County. Davidson made thirty-eight appearances, scoring eight times in all competitions.

As his contract was set to expire at the end of the 2012–13 season, talks over a new contract started in mid-December by offering him a two-year deal. Davidson turned down a new deal and also rejected a pre-contract offer from Rangers, announcing his intention to move to England. Later in the season Davidson said he wanted to lead the club to third place and refused to rule out staying for another season. In the last game of the season, Davidson played his last match, in a 2–0 win over Motherwell and after the match, he expressed his "sadness" at leaving the club.

2013–14 season
As his contract ended, Davidson was told by the club he could return in the future if his search for a new club in England was unsuccessful. Following St Johnstone's win over Rosenberg in the Europa League, Davidson rejoined the club on a one-year contract after failing to secure a move south. Afterwards Davidson said that he had re-signed for St Johnstone as they made him feel wanted.

Davidson's first game after rejoining the club came in the first leg of their Europa League third qualifying round tie, coming on as a substitute, in a 1–0 win over Belarusian side Minsk. However, Davidson didn't play in the next leg, as St Johnstone were eliminated by Minsk after a penalty shootout. He scored his first goal of the season in a 2–0 win over St Mirren on 11 January 2014. In his next game against Hearts, he came off in the 37th minute after he tore his patellar tendon; the game was a 3–3 draw.

After having knee surgery, Manager Tommy Wright announced that Davidson was unlikely to play for the rest of the season. After a season that ended with the club winning the Scottish Cup, their first major trophy in their 130-year history, Davidson signed a short-term contract until August after the club gave him a green light to make a recovery from his serious injury. Though it was a success for the club to win the Scottish Cup, Davidson expressed his disappointment that he didn't play due to his injury and also said "missing out makes you more hungry to get that chance again."

2014–15 season
While rehabilitating, Davidson missed the club's Europa League campaign and managed to recover from a knee injury, where he played 70 minutes against Ross County's under-20s. After this, Davidson signed a new contract, until the end of the season, the club's manager Tommy Wright expected his comeback as better than ever.

Davidson made his first appearance of the season on 20 September 2014, coming on as a substitute for Gary McDonald in the 79th minute, in a 2–1 loss against Inverness Caledonian Thistle. Four weeks after his return on 20 October 2014, Davidson scored his first goal of the season, in a 2–1 loss against Kilmarnock. Unfortunately, during a Scottish League Cup match against Rangers, Davidson was involved in a clash with Nicky Law, resulting in him being out of action with a concussion, though he didn't suffer a serious facial injury as first feared.

Davidson then injured his knee, which kept him out for three weeks. After making his return, Davidson then scored his second league goal on 31 January 2015, in a 1–1 draw against Motherwell. He then signed a new contract with the club on 21 February 2015. This came after he injured his calf. Davidson suffered a knee injury during a match against Hamilton Academical and was out of action for three weeks. After making his return to the first team, Davidson scored in a 1–1 draw against Dundee United on 9 May 2015.

2015–16 season
Davidson played his first match of the season, in the first round of the Europa League against Alashkert on 2 July 2015. However, Davidson damaged his knee ligament and had to be substituted, with it being suggested his injury could see him sidelined for most of the season. The outcome later showed that although it wasn't as bad as first feared, he would still be out for three months. At the end of the season, Davidson signed a new three-year contract, which would take him to ten years with the club.

2017–18 season
Davidson signed a two-year contract with St Johnstone in May 2018, with an option for a third year that is contingent on appearances.

International career
Davidson won his first Scotland under-21 cap on 10 August 2010, in a 1–1 draw with Sweden in a friendly. This came at the third time of asking after being previously called up, but having to withdraw through injury.

On 15 November 2010, Davidson was called up by Scotland manager Craig Levein to the full squad for the first time, to face the Faroe Islands in a friendly on 16 November 2010 at Pittodrie, Aberdeen. He was also included in the Scotland squad to face Brazil in March 2011, but did not make an appearance. He was again selected for the Scotland squad in November 2012, called up by caretaker manager Billy Stark for a friendly against Luxembourg. Davidson made his full international debut in this match, replacing Jordan Rhodes in the 89th minute. He became the first serving St Johnstone player to be selected for Scotland since Sandy McLaren in 1932.

Personal life
In June 2012, Davidson invested money in two greyhounds, one called Relegation Battle and the second called David Reid who between them won a dozen races that year.

In late-June 2015, Davidson became a father to a baby daughter.

Career statistics

Honours 
St Johnstone
 Scottish Cup: 2013–14, 2020–21
 Scottish League Cup: 2020–21

References

External links

1988 births
Living people
Footballers from Edinburgh
Scottish footballers
Association football midfielders
Livingston F.C. players
Cowdenbeath F.C. players
St Johnstone F.C. players
Scottish Football League players
Scottish Premier League players
Scotland under-21 international footballers
Scotland international footballers
Scottish Professional Football League players